This is a partial list of molecules that contain 1 carbon atom.

C+H+O compounds 
Each hydrogen added to a molecule can be considered as a proton plus a one-electron reduction of the redox state, while each oxygen counts as a two-electron oxidation.  Thus a net addition of H2O is a simple hydration with no net change in redox state and frequently occurs reversibly in aqueous solution.  These relationships may be viewed in the following table (peroxides and radicals are excluded; unstable or hypothetical compounds are italicized).

See also
 Carbon number
 List of compounds with carbon number 2

C00